Ford (Devon) railway station was originally named Ford railway station and stood at the eastern end of Station Road, Keyham Barton in Plymouth, South Devon.

History 
Ford station was built by the Plymouth, Devonport and South Western Junction Railway Company and came into use when the line from Lydford to Plymouth was opened on Monday 2 June 1890. Ford was joined by a number of new halts in 1906 such as Weston Mill Halt and Camels Head Halt that were constructed to allow a suburban service to be operated between Plymouth Friary and St Budeaux for Saltash station in response to competition from tram lines. William Brown, from Gosport, was the first station master and for 30 years served at the station, retiring in 1920.

The station's name in the public timetables was changed to Ford (Devon) in July 1923 to prevent confusion with Ford station in Sussex, however the name board was never altered. In 1932 one goods train, the 8:12am from Friary to Exmouth Junction Goods Yard, called between 8.50 and 9:05am.

Goods and passenger traffic ceased from Monday 7 September 1964 along with the line between Devonport King's Road Station and St Budeaux Victoria Road Station.

Infrastructure

The station stood on a double track line, partly in a cutting with two platforms, a concrete overbridge, a substantial station building with its booking office and facilities fronted by a canopy on the Down side and a small shelter on the Up. A siding, opened on Thursday 1 February 1900 to deliver bricks for the Keyham Barton housing scheme, branched off the Up line near the signal box and ran towards Ford Viaduct. Ford's Signal Box was opened on 12 May 1890 in conjunction with the first goods traffic and stood on the Up side of the line. By 1932 all of the track work relating to the single siding and the crossover had been lifted.

The old Ford Tunnel still runs beneath Victoria Place and has a stone lining with brick sections at both portal openings. The approach cutting was infilled to permit the construction of a blocks of flats.

Ford Tunnel

 During removal of spoil from Viaduct embankments an infil was completed Raising former Trackbed by 12 ft . A access gate installed at Camperdown Street.  Tunnel portal gate with original gates .2000/01 Saw introduction of new Sewage main from King's Road to Camperdown Street site was totally cleared . Former Down line Raised by 5 ft to contain new Sewer .

Current Site condition  is good condition Tunnel, Exmouth  road portal has large white lines in Brick lining to indercate where current Mainline runs above.  
Gaining  Access is Challenging as wild growth for 20 years blocks view of Pasley Street portal.

The site today
Nothing remains of the station that was demolished in the 1970s and the old cutting infilled in the 1980s. Station Road remains as indication of Ford (Devon)'s existence.

Evidence of Former Exmouth concrete  works iconic Concrete Fence panels still exist around station site and at Station Road. Standing where old foot Bridge was & looking at boundary fencing you can clearly make out the original cutting.  
The over bridge and cutting Filled in and landscaped 1989 . Spoil from Viaduct embankments and Viaduct  itself used as infill .

See also

Exeter to Plymouth railway of the LSWR

References

Notes

Sources 

Railway stations in Great Britain opened in 1890
Railway stations in Great Britain closed in 1964
Disused railway stations in Plymouth, Devon
Former Plymouth, Devonport and South Western Junction Railway stations